Dokbawi Station is a railway station on Line 6 of the Seoul Subway in Eunpyeong-gu, Seoul. This station is part of a one-way section of Line 6 known as the Eungam Loop. It is located in a relatively low-density area, and only has one exit.

Station layout

Exits
 Exit 1: Yeoncheon Elementary School

References

Metro stations in Eunpyeong District
Seoul Metropolitan Subway stations
Railway stations opened in 2000